"The Wedding" is the 12th episode in the first season of the television series How I Met Your Mother. It originally aired on January 9, 2006.

Plot 
In 2006, Ted frets about finding a date for his friends Claudia and Stuart's wedding; when Robin breaks up with Derek, Ted invites her to the wedding and she accepts. But when Ted runs into Claudia two days before the wedding and mentions that he is bringing a date, Claudia tells him that he indicated on his RSVP card that he would be coming alone and angrily forbids him from bringing a date. Ted tries to tell Robin that he will not be able to take her to the wedding, but chickens out when he sees Robin in the dress that she bought for the occasion.

When he tells Lily his problem, she, against Marshall's advice, suggests that Ted appeal to Stuart, who gives Ted permission without a second thought. Ted is excitedly anticipating his romantic evening with Robin when Claudia calls to say that the wedding has been canceled: apparently the issue of Ted's date led to a huge argument and the couple broke up. Concerned about their friend and not wanting to disappoint Robin, who is really looking forward to the wedding, Marshall and Ted go to talk to Stuart and Lily goes to comfort Claudia at MacLaren's.

Stuart says he is relieved the wedding is off and that he missed being single to Ted and Marshall. Ted tries to reassure Stuart that everyone has doubts about commitment, but those doubts should not keep him from getting married; Marshall, however, tells Stuart that he should not marry Claudia unless he is absolutely sure that he wants to. Meanwhile, at MacLaren's, Barney finds Claudia waiting for Lily and immediately tries to seduce her, offering fake sympathy and alcohol. Lily pulls Barney away from Claudia and threatens him just as Stuart arrives with Ted and Marshall. Because of Marshall's words, Stuart apologizes to Claudia and they get back together. After a few more drinks, which were prompted by Ted for asking the question that caused this whole mess again, Claudia finally agrees to allow Ted to bring a date.

On the night of the wedding Ted arrives at Robin's apartment to pick her up, but just before they leave Robin receives a phone call from her producer offering her the opportunity to anchor the news that evening. Though disappointed, Ted tells her to go to work. Ted goes to the wedding alone and Claudia shows him his RSVP, on which he did indeed check the "coming alone" box. Thinking the mistake reveals that he really has given up on finding someone, Ted tells Barney that he is ready to just be single; suddenly he locks eyes with a pretty woman across the room.

Reception
Victoria (Ashley Williams)'s first appearance on the show occurs at the end of the episode. Ted's first serious girlfriend on the show became popular with fans, defeating Robin Scherbatsky in a 2010 online poll held by the show to determine Ted's most popular ex-girlfriend. In 2011, co-creator Carter Bays stated:

References

External links 
 

How I Met Your Mother (season 1) episodes
2006 American television episodes
Television episodes about weddings